The King's School is a public school (English fee-charging boarding and day school for 13 to 18 year old pupils) in Canterbury, Kent, England. It is a member of the Headmasters' and Headmistresses' Conference and the Eton Group. It is Britain's oldest public school; and is arguably the oldest continuously operating school in the world, since education on the Abbey and Cathedral grounds has been uninterrupted since AD 597.

History
The school started as a medieval cathedral school said to have been founded during Late Antiquity in AD 597, a century after the Fall of the Western Roman Empire, by Augustine of Canterbury, considered the "Apostle to the English" and a founder of the English Church, thus making it arguably the world's oldest extant school. This is based on the fact that St Augustine founded an abbey (within the current school's grounds) where it is known that teaching took place.

When the Dissolution of the Monasteries took place, the school was re-founded by royal charter in 1541. A Headmaster, a Lower Master, and fifty King's Scholars were established and the name "King's School", was used for the first time, referring to King Henry VIII. Cardinal Pole moved the school to the Mint Yard and acquired the Almonry building, which was in use for over 300 years.

Throughout the next 100 years several former pupils achieved national recognition helping the school establish its reputation; these include the first headmaster, John Twyne, and Christopher Marlowe, William Harvey and John Tradescant the Younger. The buildings were improved and academic standards raised during the leadership of John Mitchinson and around this time the school became a "public school" with a national reputation.

When Canon John “Fred” Shirley became headmaster in 1935 the school was suffering from the effects of the depression. He managed the school's rapid expansion to around 600 pupils over the next 30 years, constructing further buildings in the precincts and helping the school survive the war-time evacuation. The school received a new Royal Charter from King George VI and Queen Elizabeth in 1946. During this time, the reputation of the school grew, helped by its academic and sporting successes.

The school was boys-only for almost 400 years, until the early 1970s, when girls were admitted to the Sixth Form for the first time, and the school has been fully co-educational since 1990. The school is also the oldest charity in the UK.

Assessment
In 2011, Rated as 'Good' by Ofsted. In 2017, the school was subject to its latest regular, independent inspection. The inspection team praised the "outstanding academic results" and the pupils' integrity, self-assurance, and "generosity of spirit". According to the Good Schools Guide, the school is "Highly successful, producing excellent results". The Guide also stated that "You need to be creative, academically able and hard-working, as everything moves fast here."

Academic results
In 2019, 54% of pupils scored A*-A for their A-Levels examination, and in 2022, 72% scored A*-A for their GCSEs.

Houses
There are 16 houses at King's, 13 boarding and 3 day. Most are named after past headmasters or people of interest in the school's history, with the exception of School House, The Grange and Carlyon. The Houses of the School are:

School House: founded 1860 (boys boarding)
The Grange: founded 1928, moved to a new building in 2007 (boys boarding)
Walpole: founded 1935, (girls boarding). Named after the novelist Sir Hugh Walpole (KS 1896–98)
Meister Omers: founded 1936, (boys boarding). 
Marlowe: founded 1936, (mixed day). Named after the poet and dramatist Christopher Marlowe (KS 1579–81)
Luxmoore: founded 1945, (girls boarding). Named after Sir Arthur Fairfax Coryndon Luxmoore (KS 1889–93), Lord Justice of Appeal
Galpin's: founded 1952, (boys boarding). Named after The Reverend Arthur Galpin, Headmaster from 1897–1910.
Linacre: founded 1953, (boys boarding). Named after Thomas Linacre, founder of the Royal College of Physicians
Broughton: founded 1976, (girls boarding). Named after William Broughton (KS 1797–1804), the first Bishop of Australia
Tradescant: founded 1976, (boys boarding). Named after John Tradescant (KS 1619–23), the distinguished gardener and collector.
Mitchinson's: founded 1982, (mixed day). Named after John Mitchinson, Headmaster 1859–73 and co-founder of the Headmasters' Conference.
Jervis: founded 1992, (girls boarding). Named after Douglas Jervis OKS
Harvey: founded 1996, (girls boarding). Named after William Harvey physician, who first determined the systemic circulation of the blood (KS 1588–92)
Bailey: first founded 1990, (sixth form girls boarding). Named after Henry Bailey, second warden of St Augustine's College between 1850 and 1875 and an honorary Canon of the Cathedral
Carlyon: founded 2005, (mixed day). Named after evacuation of the School to Carlyon Bay in Cornwall during the Second World War
Lady Kingsdown House: founded 2015, (girls boarding). Named after Lady Kingsdown, Governor Emerita

Facilities

The Beerling Hall: Music and Drama Facility, part of the 13th-century friary, endowed by the late Donald Beerling and the Cantiacorum Trust
Birleys Playing Fields: The School's sports grounds, located near the main site. A new pavilion was opened by David Gower on 17 September 2005
Blackfriars: The Cleary Foundation donated the refectory of the 13th-century friary by the Marlowe Theatre as an art school and gallery.
DT Centre: Design Technology & Engineering
Edred Wright Music School: Music
Field Classrooms: English and Mathematics
Grange Classrooms :Mathematics, Religious Studies
Harvey Science Block or Parry Hall: Biology, Chemistry
J Block: Geography
Lardergate: History and OKS Foundation
Lattergate: Religious Studies and Headmaster's office
The Malthouse: Victorian malthouse building now converted into a theatre, dance studio, dining hall, classrooms and rehearsal spaces
Maugham Library: Named in honour of dramatist W. Somerset Maugham (OKS), whose ashes were scattered on the lawn nearby.
Maurice Milner Memorial Hall: Fencing, Drama and Examination Hall
Mint Yard Classrooms: Mathematics, ICT
The Grange Yard Classrooms:  three new classrooms built in 2017 in front of Shirley Hall. They are temporary buildings situated in a previously open space.
The Old Synagogue at Canterbury: Music, Jewish Prayers. Built as a synagogue in 1847–8 by architect Hezekiah Marshall, the "Old Synagogue" is used as a recital hall by the music department and also used to host "Jewish Society". It is considered one of the finest buildings of the 19th century Egyptian Revival style.
Palace Block: a medieval building containing the Modern Languages Department
Physics Block: Physics, Geology
Pottery Room: Pottery 
Priory Block: Classics, English, Politics, Economics
The Pupils' Social Centre: under Shirley Hall with a tuckshop, cafe, stationery Shop and Careers Centre
The Recreation Centre: Gym, Hockey Pitches, Swimming Pool, etc. It is open to the general public on a membership basis.
The School Library: contains over 25,000 volumes and offers access to the School Intranet
Shirley Hall: School Assemblies and Examination Hall; formerly known as the Great Hall, renamed after the former headmaster, Fred Shirley
St. Mary's Hall: Drama, Theatre Studies
The Westbere Lakes: Sailing and Rowing

The school's Norman staircase is one of the most painted, photographed and admired sites in Canterbury. As its name suggests it dates back to the 12th century. For formal occasions, the School traditionally gathered here. Archbishops of Canterbury addressed the School from the Staircase during Visitations. King George VI, accompanied by Queen Elizabeth and Princess Elizabeth, presented the School's Royal Charter to the Dean on 11 July 1946.

Traditions

King's has many traditions including:

Purples: Until recently called 'monitors', these are the school prefects, who are marked out by their distinctive purple gowns. Only those in the highest year at the school may be a purple. Each house generally has one purple (the Head of House). The purples are headed by the Captain of School and a Vice-Captain. A head scholar and two Vice-head scholars are also invited to become Purples.
Full Canterbury Dress: The name given to the school uniform, which consists of a white shirt with wing collar, black waistcoat, pinstripe trousers, black jacket, black socks, black tie and black shoes for the boys. Girls wear a white blouse, brooch, pinstripe skirt or trousers, black jacket, black tights and black shoes. When he came to the School, Fred Shirley, Headmaster (1935–1962), updated the school uniform to sports jackets but within a year, the boys had asked to revert to their traditional garb. He tried again after the War when the School returned to Canterbury, this time taking a vote on the matter but despite the difficulty in finding outmoded clothing in a time of clothes rationing, the boys once again decided to revert to tradition. In the mid-twentieth century, there were elaborate customs relating to such matters as buttons and the angle at which a boater was worn. The girls' version was introduced by Anthony Phillips, Headmaster.
Court Dress: Worn on 'Commem Day', the last day of the school year, leavers wear court dress, consisting of white tie and black evening tailcoats, with breeches and black stockings. Purples wear their purple gowns and carry brown canes with gold handles while the Organ Scholars of the school wear black academic gowns over their court dress and carry black canes with Silver Handles.
King's Scholars: An academically-select group, marked by black jumpers with white trimmings that have recently replaced their distinctive black gowns, they process wearing surplices during school services in the Cathedral. To become a scholar, a pupil must take the Scholarship examinations at a standard approaching GCSEs prior to entry at the age of 12 to 14 (Exhibitioners may also be elected) or, in the case of honorary scholars, achieve exceptional GCSE results (9 A*s is usually the minimum) or AS Level results. King's Scholars are part of the Canterbury Cathedral Foundation and have a role in the Enthronement of the Archbishop of Canterbury. Scholars are admitted by the dean at the beginning of every school term; the scholars kneeling before the dean, who then touches their head and utters ‘Admitto Te’, formally acknowledging them as a King's Scholar. King's Scholars in the Upper Sixth are permitted to wear a black gown.
Uniform Gating: A form of punishment that requires pupils to wear Canterbury Dress all day every day, while getting a form signed by someone in a position of authority (usually a teacher or a purple) at 15-minute intervals during their free time. This can prevent them from leaving the school at all for up to a week.
Breakfast Gating: A form of punishment by which the pupil must report to breakfast and get a special slip, called a gating slip, signed at 7:30 AM.
Supper Leave/Pub Leave: A recent privilege extended to Sixth Formers, whereby pre-approved groups of people may go into town for supper or visit a pub for one night.
Monitors' Canes: A privilege given to School Monitors (Purples) and House Monitors. Purples are allowed black canes and House monitors are allowed wood coloured canes. The Head of the CCF is also allowed to carry a pace stick.
Younger Purples: A tradition in which a certain member of each house (traditionally the shortest person is chosen) are given the purple gown on days when it is a charity non-uniform day. This allows the designated person to exercise the rights of the Purples.
Green Court Privilege: Only those in 6a (the final year) are allowed to walk across Green Court; everyone else must walk around it.
Mint Yard Privilege: Only those in Galpin's and School House are allowed to walk on the Mint Yard Lawn during the Summer term
Walpole Carnations: The Valentine's Day celebrations, organised by the girls of Walpole house. Pupils send a carnation with an anonymous message to a friend or lover.

King's Week
A festival of arts, held during the last week of the summer term, introduced by Fred Shirley in 1952. The week has featured over 100 events, ranging from classical concerts to theatre performances, held in locations around Canterbury. Events have been free to attend and required no booking and a number were broadcast live.

The week has culminated in Commemoration day (known as "Commem") on the last day of the school year when the school leavers in 6a wore court dress of white tie and tails, with breeches and black stockings, or their national dress, and the whole school attended a service to commemorate the school benefactors; such benefactors include Mathew Parker, the first Archbishop of Canterbury of Elizabeth I.

Office of Fair Trading investigation

In 2005, the Office of Fair Trading (OFT) provisionally found that the school exchanged detailed information about prospective fee increases with approximately 50 other prominent UK independent schools, including Eton and Sevenoaks. The OFT stated that "regular and systematic exchange of confidential information as to intended fee increases was anti-competitive and resulted in parents being charged higher fees than would otherwise have been the case."

Staffing
Peter Roberts retired as Headmaster at the close of the Summer Term on Thursday, 7 July 2022. Elizabeth Worthington, Senior Deputy Head, is the interim head until September 2023 when Jude Lowson will become the first female Head in the history of the School

Notable headmasters
1525–1560: John Twyne
1935–1962: Fred Shirley
1975–1986: Peter Pilkington, later Lord Pilkington of Oxenford

Notable former pupils

The Junior King's School, Canterbury
The King's School has a feeder preparatory school, the Junior King's School (JKS), previously Milner Court Preparatory School. The school is a coeducational boarding and day establishment and currently has around 400 pupils aged 3 to 13. Whilst there are boarding facilities available, the majority are day pupils. JKS is now located at Milner Court in Sturry, having been originally based in the crypt of Canterbury Cathedral.

The current site was donated by Lady Milner following the death of Alfred Milner, 1st Viscount Milner in 1925. The buildings on site were opened by Rudyard Kipling in 1929, in his capacity as a close friend of Alfred Milner. Wilfrid Oldaker was headmaster from 1945 to 1956 and was the last head to occupy the manor house as the headmaster's residence. Further extensions include a sports hall (1999), a CDT block (1991) and a new music department (2016).

The King's School Shenzhen International
The King’s School planned to open its first overseas branch in the Nanshan district of Shenzhen, China in 2019. The new campus was intended to be launched in two separate phases. The Pre-Prep section for children aged 3 – 6 was planned to open in Autumn 2019, and the Main School, which will include the Junior and Senior sections for children aged 6–18, should open the following year in 2020.

See also
 List of the oldest schools in the United Kingdom
 List of the oldest schools in the world

References
Footnotes

Citations

External links

 
 

6th-century establishments in England
Educational institutions established in the 6th century
Private schools in Kent
Boarding schools in Kent
Member schools of the Headmasters' and Headmistresses' Conference
Schools in Canterbury
Co-educational boarding schools
Schools with a royal charter
Buildings and structures completed in 597